Eastern Guilford High School is a secondary school located in Gibsonville, North Carolina. The school opened in 1974. Today, it serves Grades 9 through 12, with an enrollment of approximately 1,200 students.

On November 1, 2006, a fire erupted at the school burning it to the ground. It was believed to have started in a closet in a science classroom.  Authorities believe the cause to be arson, yet no leads have come forth in over 15 years.

New school construction
The students of Eastern Guilford were attending classes at a "pod village". Construction of the new Eastern Guilford High School building is complete. The school is of the same architectural design as the recently constructed Northern Guilford High School, and has a capacity of 1,600 students. The original estimated date of completion was January 2009, but construction was not completed until April 2009. Students began attending classes in the new building when they returned from spring break.

Notable alumni
 Terrence Holt, former NFL safety and younger brother of Torry Holt
 Torry Holt, former All-Pro NFL wide receiver and Super Bowl champion with the St. Louis Rams

References

1974 establishments in North Carolina
Educational institutions established in 1974
Public high schools in North Carolina
Schools in Guilford County, North Carolina